Entolasia is a genus of African, Australian, and Papuasian plants in the grass family.

They are rhizomatous perennials.

 Species
 Entolasia imbricata - bungoma grass - central + southern Africa
 Entolasia marginata - bordered panic, Australian panicgrass - New Guinea, Queensland, New South Wales, Victoria
 Entolasia minutifolia - Queensland
 Entolasia olivacea - tropical + southern Africa
 Entolasia stricta - wiry panic - New Guinea, Queensland, New South Wales, Victoria
 Entolasia whiteana - Queensland, New South Wales

References

Panicoideae
Poaceae genera